The Chicago school of mathematical analysis is a school of thought in mathematics that emphasizes the applications of Fourier analysis to the study of partial differential equations. Mathematician Antoni Zygmund co-founded the school with his doctoral student Alberto Calderón at the University of Chicago in the 1950s. Over the years, Zygmund mentored over 40 doctoral students at the University of Chicago.

Key people 

 Antoni Zygmund 
 Alberto Calderón
Paul Cohen, Fields Medal winner (1966)

Comments 
The Chicago school of analysis is considered to be one of the strongest schools of mathematical analysis in the 20th century, which was responsible for some of the most important developments in analysis.

Awards 
In 1986, Antoni Zygmund received the National Medal of Science, in part for his "creation and leadership of the strongest school of analytical research in the contemporary mathematical world."

See also 
 Joseph Fourier
 Mathematical analysis

References

University of Chicago
Philosophical schools and traditions